The Burgundy Pit is a 1981 fantasy role-playing game adventure published by Wilmark Dynasty.

Contents
The Burgundy Pit is an adventure in which an illusionist has discovered the whereabouts of an old enemy, and has hired the party to regain a magic item.

Reception
Lewis Pulsipher reviewed The Burgundy Pit in The Space Gamer No. 48. Pulsipher commented that "The module is grossly overpriced. There is not much here, nor is the semi-professional nature of the production an excuse for astronomical price."

References

Fantasy role-playing game adventures
Role-playing game supplements introduced in 1981